The 1951 Cork Intermediate Hurling Championship was the 42nd staging of the Cork Intermediate Hurling Championship since its establishment by the Cork County Board in 1909.

Shanballymore won the championship following a 2-06 to 1-04 defeat of Midleton in the final. This was their second championship title overall and their first title since 1943.

References

Cork Intermediate Hurling Championship
Cork Intermediate Hurling Championship